Amina Masood Janjua,: born 28 April 1964, is a Pakistani activist and artist.  As an activist she is known for her work against the enforced disappearance in Pakistan. She is the chairperson of rights group Defence of Human Rights Pakistan. Her career in activism started when her husband Masood Ahmed Janjua disappeared on July 30, 2005. She provides legal support to prisoners in foreign countries, arranging financial support for the families of victims of enforced disappearance and eradication of torture from jails and detention centers. She appears regularly on local and foreign media as the spokesperson of missing persons and occasionally contributes articles in Urdu and English dailies of the country.

Early life 

Janjua was born to Shahida and Islam Akhtar Zubari in Mardan, a city in the Khyber Pakhtunkhwa province of Pakistan.

Education 

She started her early education at Presentation Convent High School Risalpur (a town and air force base near Mardan) where she studied until tenth grade. After passing her matriculation, she joined Nisar Shaheed College, in Risalpur. After two years of study in Nisar Shaheed College she joined F.G College for Women, Rawalpindi from where she passed her BA exams with English literature, Persian and Fine arts as majors. As described by her in an interview, she used to draw and paint on everything she could lay her hand on since early childhood. This talent of painting led her to Punjab University from where she got master's degree in Fine Arts securing second position and was awarded a silver medal. After receiving her master's degree, Pakistan's renowned painters Mansoor Rahi and Hajira Mansoor mentored and played a vital role in polishing her painting skills.

Career in Arts 

As an artist, her favored medium is oil and acrylic paints. Most of her paintings reflect an inclination towards expressionism and romanticism. Portraits and life drawings are amongst her favorite genres to paint. Her work had been exhibited.

Marital life 

She is married to Masood Ahmed Janjua who belongs to a military family. Her father in law, Lieutenant Colonel (R) Raja Ali Muhammad and two elder brothers-in-law have served the Pakistan Army and Pakistan Air Force. She has two sons and one daughter.

Husband's disappearance 

Her husband, Masood Ahmed janjua, who was a successful business man and ran multiple business concerns, left home to go to Peshawar on 30 July 2005 along with his friend Faisal Faraz. He never returned home nor reached his destination. Initially, his mysterious disappearance could not be accounted for but later with certain evidence convinced her that he had been picked up by an intelligence agency of the country. It was further established through the statement of one Dr. Imran Munir, who remained in the custody of military, court martialled and later released on by the orders of Supreme Court of Pakistan. In an official statement given to the government functionaries, Dr. Imran Munir testified that he has seen and met Masood Ahmed Janjua in a secret detention centre.

Her response to Masood's disappearance 

Amina states that she was devastated by the disappearance of her husband and found herself disoriented for many months while desperately taking random measures to trace her husband. Police was of no help and even did not register a case. She started to approach different power figures. She wrote letters to anyone who she thought could help, including Gen Pervez Musharraf, an Army Chief and President of Pakistan, at that time. All her efforts turned out to be futile as no one helped her.

Activism

Formation of DHR - right's group 

Early in her struggle she discovered that countless other people are victims of enforced disappearance but do not have a remedy for their malady. Victim families were forced to remain silent for fear of persecution under military rule. She started campaigning among the victims' families, co-founding the activist group named Defense of Human Rights alongside Abdul Rashid Ghazi and Khalid Khawaja. Under the banner of Defense of Human Rights, she organized her activities to trace not only her husband but all the others who had disappeared. After disappointment from all quarters, she got out of her home and staged her first road protest on 4 September 2006. This first protest was not the last because she continued this protest on daily basis for next two months.

First breakthrough 

After two months of protesting,  it was on 9 Oct 2006 that proceedings of Suo Motu case of Masood Janjua along with some other missing persons started in Supreme Court of Pakistan. Her campaigning brought results and by the end of 2006, DHR had registered and submitted one hundred cases of disappearances in the Supreme Court.

Suppression of missing people's families 

On 28 Dec 2006 in a bid to deliver a letter at GHQ gate Amina was set on marching along with her kids and other families. But the authorities subjected them to a brutal crackdown in front of Flashman's hotel, Rawalpindi. Children of Amina Masood Janjua were particularly targeted. Ali, 14, and Muhammad, 15, were beaten mercilessly and her 9-year-old daughter fainted. Muhammad was carried away forcefully by police.

Participation in lawyers' movement 

In 2007 earlier on 9 March and later on 3 November Gen Perwaiz Musharaf sacked Chief Justice of Pakistan Iftikhar Muhammad Chaudhry along with rest of the judiciary and put all the judges under house arrest. Pakistan's civil society in general and lawyers' community in particular were outraged and started a historical movement for the restoration of judiciary. The movement was popularly known as "Lawyers' Movement". Under Amina's leadership, many missing persons' families stepped out and joined this movement. She participated with full force in every endeavour for the rule of law. At last, the deposed Chief Justice and rest of the judges were restored on 16 March 2009.

First day/night camp 

Amina, whose only hope had been the judiciary, was heavily disappointed when the missing persons' case could not appear on Supreme Court's docket for many months. Sad but undaunted, she decided to jolt the Court. She set up a protest camp in a small tent right outside Supreme Court's gate. She stayed in that tent for 12 days and 12 nights from 2 November 2009 to 13 November 2009.

Results of camp-2009 

At last, her efforts bore fruit and the Registrar of Supreme Court called Amina Masood Janjua in his office on 13 November 2009 and promised for immediate hearing and asked to call off her sit-in. As a result, hearing of cases of missing persons resumed on 23 November 2009 once again.

First Commission of Inquiry 

In 2010, under Supreme Court's directions, the government formed a commission of inquiry to resolve the missing persons' cases, which was headed by Justice (r) Mansoor Alam. Amina fully cooperated with this commission, worked day and night, and submitted cases of forced disappeared persons for investigation and accompanied every complainant for the proceedings. The commission concluded its finding and issued a report at the end of __ months period. But the government neither published the report nor acted upon its recommendations.

Second Commission of Inquiry 

Instead of paying heed to the first commission of inquiry, the government formed another commission of inquiry to resolve the issue of enforced disappearance. Although Amina had learned by now that such commissions were merely tactics to give false hope and gain time, she started to work with this second commission as well. But this commission acted more in defence of the perpetrators of enforced disappearance than to find missing persons.

Arrest 

On 16 March 2011, Amina, along with her daughter and 40 other women, children and old men, was arrested and remained detained overnight by the authorities while the congregation was on its way to present flowers to then Chief Justice of Pakistan Iftikhar Muhammad Chaudhry on the anniversary of restoration of Judiciary. This was the day infamous Raymond Davis was set free.

Second day/night camp

Anguished by the time wasted by the commission of inquiry and Supreme Courts dwindling interest in the missing persons issue, she organized a second day/night protest in front of Parliament House Islamabad on 31 Oct 2011. She wrapped up this camp  the very next day on the appearance of Justice (r) Javaid Iqbal at the scene, who is heading the commission of inquiry. The Judge announced in front of media that he, in his official capacity, promises to divulge a final solution for the recovery of the missing persons within two weeks time. He did not keep his promise.

Third day/night camp

Continuing her struggle, she organized third day/night protest camp in front of Parliament House Islamabad which started on 15 February 2012 and continued for 75 days until 30 April 2012. She, along with families of more than 500 missing persons, stayed on the road side, garnering huge support and attention of media and civil society.

Results of Camp-2012 

Almost all the top leadership of important political parties visited the camp and showed solidarity with the cause, including Mian Nawaz Sharif, who was leading the opposition at that moment. The government, influenced by pressure, passed two unanimous resolutions, one in National Assembly and one in Senate, pledging to take measures to trace all missing persons and stop further incidents of enforced disappearance.

Death threats

She is continually under death threat via mail and phone from unknown persons. She informed the Supreme Court of the same consequently Court ordered the government to provide her with security.

Foreign visits

In 2008, she was invited by Amnesty International for a visit to Europe and USA. She addressed conferences in London, Birmingham, Manchester, Lausanne, Lucerne, Bern, Geneva, Zurich, Berlin, Hannover, Oslo, and Stockholm. Also, she met with the powerful government officials of many countries during her visits.

US visa cancellation

In 2008, her US visa was cancelled two hours before she was supposed to travel to the US. The US embassy never disclosed the reasons behind the refusal.

Role in media

She acts as the sole spokesperson of DHR Pakistan and continuously presents the missing persons' issue in Pakistan's as well as international media.

Role as chairperson DHR

Her activities as chairperson of Defence of Human Rights involves coordination with all the offices in Government circles like, PMs secretariat, Ministry of Defense, Ministry of Interior, Ministry of Law and Justice and HR, Supreme Court, Foreign office, FIA, NAB, City Administration, Army, provincial and tribal governments etc. She organises campaigns and manages all the activities of DHR. Her work includes coordination with international human rights organizations like Amnesty International, Human Rights Watch, Cageprisoners etc.

Her role in Supreme Court

In Nov 2006, she filed her first independent petition in Supreme Court for 16 missing persons. Chief Justice Iftikhar Muhammad Chaudhry allowed her to plead for the other missing persons as an advocate. Since then, she is continually appearing in the cases of missing  persons in the Supreme Court. Presently, she alone is representing more than 700 cases of enforced disappearance.

Her role in commission of inquiry

Like Supreme Court, she also prepares and submits cases to Commission of Inquiry on Enforced Disappearance. Also, she appears in Commission of Inquiry on behalf of complainants.

Foreign Prisoners

Her engagement with forced disappeared and secretly detained persons led her to realize the difficulties faced by persons who are detained in foreign lands. In 2010, she managed to repatriate twenty two Pakistanis from Thailand who had been facing life imprisonments for minor crimes under royal laws of the country. Her present projects involves repatriation of fifty two foreign prisoners detained in Pakistani jails to their respective countries and repatriation of more than three hundred Pakistanis who are detained in China.

Notes

External links
514 detained in five internment centers - AMJ represents hundreds of cases
Mention of brutal crack down on families
Europe Visit and cancellation of US Visa

1964 births
Living people
Pakistani democracy activists
Pakistani human rights activists
Pakistani women's rights activists
Pakistani civil rights activists
University of the Punjab
Imprisonment and detention
Human rights abuses in Pakistan
Kidnapping in Pakistan
Political repression in Pakistan
Enforced disappearances in Pakistan